DeAndre Williams (born October 4, 1996) is an American college basketball player for the Memphis Tigers of the American Athletic Conference (AAC). He previously played for the Evansville Purple Aces.

High school career
Williams played basketball for Klein Forest High School in Klein, Texas. After his junior season, he enrolled at the Sports Association of Texas for Christian Homeschoolers, with whom he completed online courses and improved academically in hopes of qualifying for an NCAA Division I scholarship. He started training under the guidance of former NBA coach John Lucas II. He played a postgraduate season at Nation Wide Academy, a new program in Oklahoma City, Oklahoma. He averaged 24 points and 11 rebounds per game.

College career
Williams was ruled ineligible by the National Collegiate Athletic Association for his 2018–19 season at Evansville. He was designated as an academic non-qualifier but was allowed to keep his athletic scholarship and practice with the team after Evansville submitted a waiver. On November 12, 2019, in his second career game, he helped his team achieve a 67–64 upset win over No. 1 Kentucky in Rupp Arena. On December 7, he recorded a career-high 37 points and 10 rebounds, shooting 17-of-18 from the field, in a 101–87 win against Miami (Ohio). Williams missed 14 of Evansville's final 17 games with a back injury. As a freshman, he averaged 15.2 points, 6.9 rebounds and 2.7 assists per game while shooting 64.8 percent from the floor. Williams was a four-time Missouri Valley Conference Newcomer of the Week honoree. After the season, he entered the transfer portal and declared for the 2020 NBA draft while maintaining his college eligibility.

For his sophomore season, Williams transferred to Memphis, choosing the Tigers over Kentucky, Arkansas and Baylor. He became eligible about three weeks into the season, after the NCAA approved a blanket waiver for Division I transfers due to the COVID-19 pandemic. Williams helped Memphis win the 2021 National Invitation Tournament, posting a season-high 21 points, nine rebounds, six assists and four steals in a 90–67 semifinal win over Colorado State. As a sophomore, he averaged 11.7 points, 5.8 rebounds, 3.4 assists and 2.2 steals per game. Williams was named to the Second Team All-AAC as a junior.

Career statistics

College

|-
| style="text-align:left;"| 2019–20
| style="text-align:left;"| Evansville
| 18 || 15 || 27.1 || .648 || .455 || .800 || 6.9 || 2.7 || .9 || 1.0 || 15.2
|-
| style="text-align:left;"| 2020–21
| style="text-align:left;"| Memphis
| 21 || 20 || 26.1 || .497 || .455 || .692 || 5.8 || 3.4 || 2.2 || .5 || 11.7
|-
| style="text-align:left;"| 2021–22
| style="text-align:left;"| Memphis
| 26 || 25 || 25.0 || .564 || .300 || .693 || 5.8 || 1.7 || 1.3 || .7 || 11.1
|- class="sortbottom"
| style="text-align:center;" colspan="2"| Career
| 65 || 60 || 25.9 || .567 || .406 || .725 || 6.1 || 2.6 || 1.5 || .7 || 12.4

References

External links
Memphis Tigers bio
Evansville Purple Aces bio

1996 births
Living people
American men's basketball players
Basketball players from Houston
Small forwards
Evansville Purple Aces men's basketball players
Memphis Tigers men's basketball players